U Htin Linn Aung (also spelt Htin Lin Aung) is a Burmese politician, social activist, former inmate, and technician who currently serves as the Union Minister of Communications, Information and Technology of the National Unity Government of Myanmar.

Early life and education
Htin Linn Aung was born in Nyaungdon,  Maubin District, Ayeyarwady Region and was an alumnus of Rangoon Institute of Technology. He completed his bachelor's degree in Science in Computer Network and Security from the University of Maryland.

Political career
He joined the student movements in 1996 and 1998 during his university years at the Rangoon Institute of Technology (RIT). In 2000, he was sentenced to prison for seven years for his involvement in the student movement at Pyay Technological University.

He moved to Maryland in 2008 after taking part in the Saffron Revolution.

On 22 February 2021, when CRPH's international relations office was opened in Maryland, Htin Linn Aung was appointed as its special representative.

References

External links

Living people
Burmese politicians
Burmese activists
Burmese prisoners and detainees
Burmese democracy activists
People from Ayeyarwady Region
Year of birth missing (living people)
21st-century Burmese politicians